Cheolindo is a 1930 Korean film written, directed by and starring Na Woon-gyu. It premiered at Dansungsa Theater in downtown Seoul.

Plot summary
The plot concerns two rival villages separated by a hill, and the competition between men from both villages over the daughter of Reverend Suh.

References

External links 
 Images from Cheolindo at The Korean Film Archive (KOFA)

See also
 Korea under Japanese rule
 List of Korean-language films
 Cinema of Korea

1930 films
Pre-1948 Korean films
Korean silent films
Korean black-and-white films
Films directed by Na Woon-gyu